The 1964 United States presidential election in Utah took place on November 3, 1964, as part of the 1964 United States presidential election. State voters chose four representatives, or electors, to the Electoral College, who voted for president and vice president.

Utah was won by incumbent President Lyndon B. Johnson (D–Texas), with 54.86 percent of the popular vote, against Senator Barry Goldwater (R–Arizona), with 45.14 percent of the popular vote. , this is the last time a Democratic presidential candidate has carried Utah or even exceeded 40% of the state's vote.

As of 2020, it is the last time that Utah County, Weber County, Wasatch County, Duchesne County, Juab County, Morgan County, Beaver County, Wayne County, and Daggett County have voted Democratic.

Results

Results by county

See also
 United States presidential elections in Utah

References

Utah
1964
1964 Utah elections